Danny Sabatello (born March 31, 1993) is an American mixed martial artist who competes in the Bantamweight division of Bellator MMA. As of December 13, 2022, he is #5 in the Bellator Bantamweight Rankings.

Background 
Coming from a Sicilian family whose roots trace back to Palermo, Danny Sabatello was born in Chicago, Illinois, in the suburb of Long Grove. He graduated from Stevenson High School in Lincolnshire, Illinois, where he was a two-time Illinois state champion, going 152-19, which included two years at St. Viator High School, He went to wrestle Division I at Purdue University, where his older brothers Joey and Vinny also went. While there, he was a three-time NCAA Championships qualifier at 133 and 141, and a two-time 141-pound Big Ten Championship place-winner. He also become the first Purdue wrestler to twice earn Big Ten Wrestler of the Week honors in his career. After finished his college degree in Law and Society with a minor in Organizational Leadership and Supervision, He moved to South Florida after his wrestling career on a whim to become a MMA fighter, eventually landing at American Top Team.

Mixed martial arts career

Early career
Making his MMA debut in 2018, Sabatello submitted Ray Paige in the first round and would go on to defeat his next 4 opponents on the Florida regional scene, 3 by first round stoppages. Making his debut for Titan FC at Titan FC 56, Sabatello defeated Philip Keller via TKO stoppage in the first round. He was then given a chance to challenge reigning champ Irwin Rivera at Titan FC 58 on December 20, 2019. Sabatello lost the bout via fourth-round technical knockout due to a body punch.

Rebounding at Titan FC 56, he submitted Chris Johnson in the third round via arm-triangle choke, and at Titan FC 60, Sabatello was given another chance for the Titan FC Bantamweight Championship against Raymond Ramos, winning the bout and title via rear-naked choke in the first round.

After winning the Titan FC title, Sabatello was given a spot on Dana White's Contender Series 35 against Taylor Moore. Despite judges scores of 30-24, 30-25, 30-26 on the road to a unanimous decision victory, Sabatello was not given a UFC contract.

Returning to Titan FC, Sabatello faced future UFC fighter Da’mon Blackshear at Titan FC 67, defeating him over five round to defend his title.

Bellator MMA
Sabatello, as a replacement for Matheus Mattos, faced Brett Johns on May 21, 2021 at Bellator 259. Sabatello won the bout via unanimous decision.

Sabatello was expected to face the 34-fight veteran Johnny Campbell on August 13, 2021 at Bellator 264. However, the bout was cancelled during fight week due to health and safety protocols, with Sabatello being confirmed to have tested positive for COVID-19.

Bellator Bantamweight World Grand Prix 
Due to the pull out of two fighters from the Bellator Bantamweight World Grand Prix due to injuries, a wild card bout between Sabatello and Jornel Lugo was announced for  April 22, 2022 at Bellator 278. He won the bout in dominant fashion via unanimous decision.

After the bout, Sabatello signed a new long term deal with the promotion.

Sabatello faced Leandro Higo in the quarter-finals of the Bellator Bantamweight World Grand Prix at Bellator 282 on June 24, 2022. He won the bout via unanimous decision. Sabatello was fined $5,000 for abusive language in his post fight speech by the Mohegan Tribe Department of Athletic Regulation.

In the semi-finals, Sabatello face Raufeon Stots on December 9, 2022 in the main event at Bellator 289. He lost the fight via split decision.

Post Grand Prix 
Sabatello is scheduled to face Marcos Breno on April 21, 2023 at Bellator 294.

Championships and accomplishments 

 Titan Fighting Championships
 Titan FC Bantamweight Championship (one time)
 One successful title defense

Mixed martial arts record

|-
|Loss
|align=center|13–2
|Raufeon Stots
|Decision (split)
|Bellator 289
|
|align=center|5
|align=center|5:00
|Uncasville, Connecticut, United States
|
|-
|Win
|align=center|13–1
|Leandro Higo
|Decision (unanimous)
|Bellator 282
|
|align=center|5
|align=center|5:00
|Uncasville, Connecticut, United States
|
|-
|Win
|align=center|12–1
|Jornel Lugo
|Decision (unanimous)
|Bellator 278
|
|align=center|3
|align=center|5:00
|Honolulu, Hawaii, United States
|
|-
|Win
|align=center|11–1
|Brett Johns
|Decision (unanimous)
|Bellator 259 
|
|align=center|3
|align=center|5:00
|Uncasville, Connecticut, United States
|
|-
|Win
|align=center|10–1
|Da'Mon Blackshear
|Decision (unanimous)
|Titan FC 67
|
|align=center|5
|align=center|5:00
|Miami, Florida, United States
|
|-
|Win
|align=center|9–1
|Taylor Moore
|Decision (unanimous)
|Dana White's Contender Series 35 
|
|align=center|3
|align=center|5:00
|Las Vegas, Nevada, United States
|
|-
|Win
|align=center|8–1
|Raymond Ramos
|Submission (rear-naked choke)
|Titan FC 61
|
|align=center|1
|align=center|1:56
|Miami, Florida, United States
|
|-
| Win
| align=center|7–1
| Chris Johnson
| Submission (arm-triangle choke)
| Titan FC 60
| 
|align=center|3
|align=center|1:54
|Miami, Florida, United States
|
|-
| Loss
| align=center|6–1
| Irwin Rivera
| TKO (punch to the body)
| Titan FC 58
| 
| align=center| 4
| align=center| 4:26
| Fort Lauderdale, Florida, United States
| 
|-
| Win
| align=center| 6–0
| Philip Keller
| TKO (punches)
|Titan FC 56
|
|align=center|1
|align=center|1:41
|Fort Lauderdale, Florida, United States
| 
|-
| Win
| align=center| 5–0
| Earnest Walls
| Submission (rear-naked choke)
|War at the Rock 2
|
|align=center|1
|align=center|1:34
|Hollywood, Florida, United States
|
|-
| Win
| align=center| 4–0
| John Barragan
| KO
| Underground Cage Fighting Championship 3
| 
| align=center| 1
| align=center| 2:29
| West Palm Beach, Florida, United States
| 
|-
| Win
| align=center| 3–0
| Jeremias Fernandez
| Decision (unanimous)
| War at the Rock 1
| 
| align=center| 3
| align=center| 5:00
| Hollywood, Florida, United States
|
|-
| Win
| align=center| 2–0
| Cesar Danny Gonzalez
| KO (punch)
| Underground Cage Fighting Championship 2
| 
| align=center| 1
| align=center| 0:53
| West Palm Beach, Florida, United States
|
|-
| Win
| align=center| 1–0
| Ray Paige
| Submission
| Underground Cage Fighting Championship 1
| 
| align=center| 1
| align=center| 2:55
| West Palm Beach, Florida, United States
|

See also 

 List of current Bellator fighters
 List of male mixed martial artists

References

External links 
  
 

1993 births
Living people
Bantamweight mixed martial artists
American male mixed martial artists
Bellator male fighters